Selbekken is a village in the municipality of Orkland in Trøndelag county, Norway. The village is located directly south of the village of Lensvik along the Trondheimsfjorden and the Norwegian County Road 710.

The village was the administrative centre of the old Agdenes municipality until 2020 when it merged into Orkland Municipality.

References

Villages in Trøndelag
Orkland
Trondheimsfjord